Dive Deep is the third studio album by  the English group Quintessence.

Track listing
Side one
 "Dive Deep" (Quintessence) – 4:44
 "Dance for the One" (Quintessence, lyrics by Stanley Barr) – 10:45
 "Brahman" (Quintessence) – 4:17
Side two
 "The Seer" (Quintessence) – 6:00
 "Epitaph for Tomorrow" (Quintessence, lyrics by Stanley Barr) – 8:21
 "Sri Ram Chant" (Swami Ambikankanda) – 7:58

Personnel
 Sambhu Babaji – bass guitar, Jew's harp, acoustic guitar
 Maha Dev – rhythm guitar
 Shiva Shankar Jones – vocals, keyboards, percussion
 Jake Milton – drums, percussion
 Allan Mostert – lead guitar, veena
 Raja Ram – flute, chimes

References 

1971 albums
Quintessence (English band) albums
Island Records albums